Jesse Way Whiting (May 30, 1879 – October 28, 1937) was a pitcher in Major League Baseball. He pitched from 1902 to 1907.

External links

1879 births
1937 deaths
Baseball players from Pennsylvania
Major League Baseball pitchers
Brooklyn Superbas players
Philadelphia Phillies players
Philadelphia Athletics (minor league) players
Harrisburg Ponies players
Manchester Colts players
Lawrence Colts players
Jersey City Skeeters players